Calabar (also referred to as Callabar, Calabari, Calbari  and Kalabar) is the capital city of Cross River State, Nigeria. It was originally named Akwa Akpa, in the Efik language. The city is adjacent to the Calabar and Great Kwa rivers and creeks of the Cross River (from its inland delta).

Calabar is often described as the tourism capital of Nigeria, especially due to several initiatives implemented during the administration of Donald Duke as governor of Cross River State (1999–2007), which made the city the cleanest and most environmentally friendly city in Nigeria. Administratively, the city is divided into Calabar Municipal and Calabar South Local Government Areas.

History

Calabar was the name given by the Portuguese discoverers from the 15th century to the tribes on this part of the Guinea coast at the time of their arrival, when the present inhabitants in the district were the Quas. It was not till the early part of the 18th century that the Efik people, owing to civil war with their kindred and the Ibibio, migrated from the neighborhood of the Niger River to the shores of the Calabar.

On the 10th of September 1884, Queen Victoria signed a treaty of protection with the king and chiefs of Akwa Akpa, known to Europeans as Old Calabar—then the official title to distinguish it from New Calabar to the east. This enabled the United Kingdom to exercise control over the entire territory around Calabar, including Bakassi. Calabar was the headquarter of the European administration in the Niger Delta until 1906 when the seat of government was moved to Lagos.

Seaport city

Since the 16th century, Calabar has served as an international seaport, shipping out goods such as palm oil. During the period of the Atlantic slave trade, it became a major port in the transportation of African slaves and was named Calabar by the Spanish. Igbo people formed the majority of enslaved Africans who were sold as slaves from Calabar, despite forming a minority among the ethnic groups in the region.

From 1725 until 1750, roughly 17,000 enslaved Africans were sold from Calabar to European slave traders; from 1772 to 1775, the number soared to over 62,000. , as part of the British blockade of Africa against the slave trade, sailed into Duke Town in 1815, where she captured seven Spanish and Portuguese slave ships. African-American writer and slave John Jea came from the area. A small mulatto community of merchants was located there that had links to missionary and other merchant colonies in Igboland, Lagos, and across the Atlantic.

Landmarks
The city was the home of the first social club in Nigeria, the Africa Club. It hosted the first competitive football, cricket and field hockey games in Nigeria. Among the city's firsts were the first Roman Catholic Mass (held at 19 Bocco Street, Calabar – 1903) and the oldest secondary school (Hope Waddell Training Institution – 1895) in eastern Nigeria. The school later graduated Nnamdi Azikiwe, who was elected as the first President of Nigeria.

The city has several museums (including the Slave History Museum), a botanical garden, a free trade zone/port, an international airport and seaport, an integrated sports stadium complex, a cultural center, one of the most prominent universities in the country – the University of Calabar, a slave history park and several historical and cultural landmarks. It also has several standards hotels, resorts and amusement parks. The former Liberian warlord Charles Taylor lived in the old colonial palace in the city, under an agreement that led to the end of his country's civil war, before fleeing extradition to Liberia in March 2006.

The Tinapa Resort, a development by the Cross River State government, lies to the north of the city beside the Calabar Free Trade Zone.

The Cross River State Annual Christmas Festival held every year attracts thousands from within and beyond Nigeria. The festival includes music performances from both local and international artists. Other annual events include the Calabar Carnival, a boat regatta, fashion shows, a Christmas Village, traditional dances, and the annual Ekpe Festival.

Climate 
Under Köppen's climate classification, Calabar features a tropical monsoon climate (Köppen: Am) amidst a lengthy wet season spanning ten months and a short dry season covering the remaining two months. The harmattan, which significantly influences weather in West Africa, is noticeably less pronounced in the city. Temperatures are relatively constant throughout the year, with average high temperatures usually ranging from 25 to 28 degrees Celsius. There is also little variance between daytime and nighttime temperature, as temperatures at night are typically only a few degrees lower than the daytime high temperature.

Political authority

Calabar has three principal landlord kingdoms, namely the Qua Kingdom of Ejagham (Ekoi)/Bantu origin, the Efut and the Efik Kingdoms. The Qua Kingdom has the Ndidem of the Qua nation as the Grand Patriarch, the Efut have the Muri munene as the Grand Patriarch, and the Efik Kingdom patriarch is known as the Obong.

Traditional authority of Calabar
Before the colonial period, Calabar, originally known as Akwa Akpa, was a kingdom with the City of Calabar as the site of government. Calabar has three different monarchs, the Obong of Calabar as the ruler of the Efiks and the Ekpe secret society as the stool on which the Obong of Calabar sat. The Ndidem of Calabar is the ruler of the Quas and paramount ruler of Calabar Municipality which is the seat of government. The muri munene of the Efuts who is the ruler of the Efuts and paramount ruler of Calabar South.

Calabar people

Calabar people are mainly people from the old Calabar province – Calabar South, Calabar Municipality, Akpabuyo, Bakassi, Biase, Odukpani and Akamkpa, but as commonly used in Nigeria, the term "Calabar people" could also refer to the indigenes of Greater Calabar as well as the people of the original South Eastern State of Nigeria who are at present the people of Akwa Ibom State and Cross River State.

Nigerian Navy
Calabar is the headquarters of the Eastern Naval Command. The city has a new model school, Nigerian Navy Secondary School, situated in Akpabuyo, about 10 minutes' drive from the airport. This new school complements the existing Nigerian Navy Primary School and Naval Officers Wives Association Primary School, both situated at Ikot Ansa Calabar.

Gallery

See also
Banknotes of Scotland (featured on design)
Kalabari tribe
Efik people

References

External links

University of Calabar

 
Populated places in Cross River State
State capitals in Nigeria
Port cities and towns in Nigeria
Cross River (Nigeria)
Cities in Nigeria